Powningville is a former settlement in El Dorado County, California.

References

Former settlements in El Dorado County, California
Former populated places in California